The name Labour (or Labor) Party, or similar, is used by political parties around the world, particularly in countries of the Commonwealth of Nations. They are usually, but not exclusively, social-democratic or democratic-socialist and traditionally allied to trade unions and the labour movement. Many labour parties are members of the Socialist International and/or participants of the Progressive Alliance.

Active Labour parties

Historical Labour parties

See also

Labour Party (disambiguation)
Communist party
List of communist parties
Democratic Socialist Party (disambiguation)
Labour government
Labour movement
List of left-wing political parties
Social Democratic Party
List of social democratic parties
Socialist Labour Party (disambiguation)
Socialist Party
Socialist Workers Party (disambiguation)
Workers' Party

Socialism
Labour